The play-off stage of the 2018 Emerging Nations World Championship was a rugby league competition, the second stage of the 2018 Emerging Nations World Championship, which began on 9 October and concluded on 13 October. The teams were split into Cup, Trophy, and Plate play-offs based on their results in the pool stage, which concluded on 7 October.

Cup

{{rugbyleaguebox
| event     = 2018 Emerging Nations – Cup Semi-Final
| date      = 10 October 2018
| time      = 12:00 AEST (UTC+10)
| team1     = 
| score     = 16 – 8
| report    = Report
| team2     = 
| try1      = W. Lolo, Payne, Utatao
| goal1     = Paea (2/3)
| try2      = Vrahnos
| goal2     = Stratis (2/2)
| stadium   = New Era Stadium, Sydney
| attendance= ≈450
| referee   = Dillan Wells (Australia)
}}

{{rugbyleaguebox
| event     = 2018 Emerging Nations – Cup Semi-Final
| date      = 10 October 2018
| time      = 13:45 AEST (UTC+10)
| team1     = 
| score     = 10 – 20
| report    = Report
| team2     = 
| try1      = P. Ivan, Varga
| goal1     = D. Farkas (1)
| try2      = Campbell, T. Cassel, Cregan, Greene
| goal2     = Benson (2)
| stadium   = New Era Stadium, Sydney
| attendance= ≈300
| referee   = Blake Williams (Australia)
}}

{{rugbyleaguebox
| event     = 2018 Emerging Nations – 3rd Place Final
| date      = 13 October 2018
| time      = 13:55 AEST (UTC+10)
| team1     = 
| score     = 26 – 18
| report    = Report
| team2     = 
| try1      = Mamouzelos (2), G. Tsikrikas (2), Stratis
| goal1     = Stratis (3)
| try2      = Acsai, P. Ivan, McKewin
| goal2     = J. Farkas (3)
| stadium   = St Marys Stadium (field 2), Sydney
| attendance= ≈350
| referee   = Ethan Murray (Australia)
}}

{{rugbyleaguebox
| event     = 2018 Emerging Nations – Cup Final
| date      = 13 October 2018
| time      = 15:55 AEST (UTC+10)
| team1     = 
| score     = 16 – 24
| report    = Report
| team2     = 
| try1      = G. Lolo, Ulukita, Utatao
| goal1     = Paea (2)
| try2      = Benson (2), Attard, Dallas, Sammut
| goal2     = Sammut (2)
| stadium   = St Marys Stadium, Sydney
| attendance= ≈1,100
| referee   = Cameron Turner (Australia)
}}

Trophy

{{rugbyleaguebox
| event     = 2018 Emerging Nations – Trophy Semi-Final
| date      = 10 October 2018
| time      = 15:30 AEST (UTC+10)
| team1     = 
| score     = 29 – 16
| report    = Report
| team2     = 
| try1      = Goodwin, Gordon, Sheedy, Stephenson, Stubbs
| goal1     = Wiggins (4)
| drop1     = Sheedy
| try2      = Dalcik (2), A. Salman-Cochrane
| goal2     = Bokeyhan Surer (2)
| stadium   = New Era Stadium, Sydney
| attendance= ≈450
| referee   = Ethan Murray (Australia)
}}

{{rugbyleaguebox
| event     = 2018 Emerging Nations – Trophy Semi-Final
| date      = 10 October 2018
| time      = 17:15 AEST (UTC+10)
| team1     = 
| score     = 4 – 44
| report    = Report
| team2     = 
| try1      = Arutahiki
| goal1     = 
| try2      = Korostchuk (2), Metuangaro (2), A. Kowalski, Niszczot, H. Siejka, Wertsak
| goal2     = Niszczot (3), H. Siejka (2), Metuangaro (1)
| stadium   = New Era Stadium, Sydney
| attendance= ≈150
| referee   = Cody Simmons (Australia)
}}

{{rugbyleaguebox
| event     = 2018 Emerging Nations – 7th Place Final
| date      = 13 October 2018
| time      = 12:15 AEST (UTC+10)
| team1     = 
| score     = 27 – 26
| report    = Report
| team2     = 
| try1      = Baskonyali (2), Bokeyhan Surer, Dalcik, P. Salman-Cochrane
| goal1     = Bokeyhan Surer (3)
| drop1     = Baskonyali
| try2      = Arutahiki (2), Philip (2), Kaltonga, Napakaurana
| goal2     = Kaltonga (1)
| stadium   = St Marys Stadium (field 2), Sydney
| attendance= ≈250
| referee   = Mitchell Robinson (Australia)
}}

{{rugbyleaguebox
| event     = 2018 Emerging Nations – Trophy Final
| date      = 13 October 2018
| time      = 14:00 AEST (UTC+10)
| team1     = 
| score     = 10 – 14
| report    = Report
| team2     = 
| try1      = Goodwin, Kucia
| goal1     = Bien (1)
| try2      = Korostchuk, Niszczot, H. Siejka
| goal2     = Niszczot (1)
| stadium   = St Marys Stadium, Sydney
| attendance= ≈500
| referee   = Blake Williams (Australia)
}}

Plate

{{rugbyleaguebox
| event     = 2018 Emerging Nations – Plate Play-Off
| date      = 9 October 2018
| time      = 18:30 AEST (UTC+10)
| team1     = 
| score     = 44 – 22
| report    = 
| team2     = 
| try1      = Maebata (2), Moe'ava (2), Sanga, Taupongi, Tengemoana, L. Tongaka
| goal1     = Sanga (5/7), Moe'ava (1/1)
| try2      = Shibasaki (2), Fujitaka, Grieve
| goal2     = F. Karino (3/4)
| stadium   = Windsor Sporting Complex, Sydney
| attendance= 45
| referee   = Joseph Green (Australia)
}}

{{rugbyleaguebox
| event     = 2018 Emerging Nations – Plate Play-Off
| date      = 11 October 2018
| time      = 16:30 AEST (UTC+10)
| team1     = 
| score     = 30 – 32
| report    = 
| team2     = 
| try1      = Griffiths, Lindsay, McMurrich, Ryan, Spence
| goal1     = Lindsay (5/5)
| try2      = Shibasaki (2), Fujitaka, Fukushige, Gerediaga Etxaburu, Matsuo
| goal2     = Sugano (4/4), F. Karino (0/3)
| stadium   = Windsor Sporting Complex, Sydney
| attendance= 22
| referee   = Ethan Murray (Australia)
}}

{{rugbyleaguebox
| event     = 2018 Emerging Nations – Plate Play-Off
| date      = 13 October 2018
| time      = 15:40 AEST (UTC+10)
| team1     = 
| score     = 56 – 14
| report    = 
| team2     = 
| try1      = Angikimua (3), Manau (2), Moe'ava (2), Sa'omatangi, Sanga, Singamoana, Tengemoana
| goal1     = Moe'ava (5/9), Sanga (1/2)
| try2      = Barnes, Lindsay, McMurrich
| goal2     = Barnes (1/1), Lee (0/1), Lindsay (0/1)
| stadium   = St Marys Stadium (field 2), Sydney
| attendance= ≈100
| referee   = Robert Morey (Australia)
}}

External links
 2018 Emerging Nations World Championship on RugbyLeagueProject.org

2018 in rugby league
Rugby League Emerging Nations Tournament
Rugby league in Sydney